K. N. Y. Patanjali was a noted writer, journalist from Andhra Pradesh. He worked in various news papers like Eenadu, Andhra Bhoomi, Udayam, Andhra Prabha. He was also the editor of Sakshi news paper. He wrote many novels and short stories. Most of his writings has his own style of satire. He died on 11 March 2009 in Visakhapatnam.

Personal life 
Patanjali was born on 29 March 1952 in Alamanda of Vizianagaram district of Andhra Pradesh to the couple K. V. V. Gopala Raju and Seeta Devi. While pursuing his elementary education, he also learnt Ayurveda from his father. He started writing from young age.

Journalist 
He joined Eenadu news paper as a journalist in 1975 in worked there till 1984. From 1984 to 1990, he worked for Udayam news paper. Later he also worked for Andhra Bhoomi, and Mahanagar. He started his own news paper Patanjali Patrika and ran it for 16 months. Then he joined Andhra Prabha in 2003. He worked with TV9 for a few months before taking over as an editor of Sakshi. He fell ill after some time. He died on 11 March 2009 in Visakhapatnam in a private hospital.

Writer 
He was inspired by the writings of Raavi Sastry. Pempudu Jantuvu (Pets) is based on the lives of journalists. Khaki Vanam (Brown garden) is based on the lives of the Police.

Writings 
 Amrutopamanam
 Khaki Vanam
 Pempudu Jantuvulu
 Rajugoru
 Veera Bobbili
 Gopatrudu
 Pilaka Tirugudu Puvvu
 Raju Gari Logillu
 Patanjali Bhashyam

Manasu Foundation published his complete works in two volumes.

Awards 
Nandi Award for Best Dialogue Writer - Sindhooram (1997)

References 

Telugu writers
1952 births
2009 deaths
People from Vizianagaram district